Gran Sol (also Hotel Gran Sol, Hotel Tryp Gran Sol and officially Edificio Alonso) is a skyscraper and hotel in Alicante, Spain. It is 97 meters tall and has 31 floors. It's a brand hotel Tryp Hotels belonging to the hotel group Sol Melia.

The hotel is the third tallest building in the city after Estudiotel Alicante (117 m) and El Barco (111 m). The "Great Sun" is characterized by the colorful murals painted on two of its facades, and to be located opposite the port of Alicante, has become, along with the Castillo de Santa Barbara, a characteristic element of the horizon or skyline of the city.

The hotel was completed in 1971 and was completely renovated in 2003. Has 123 four star (****) rooms and a restaurant on the 26th floor.

See also 
 Estudiotel Alicante

External links 

Page of Hotel Tryp Gran Sol

References 

Buildings and structures in Alicante
Skyscraper hotels in Spain
Buildings and structures completed in 1970